The Australian GT Trophy Series is an annual Australian motor racing competition for FIA GT3 cars and similar approved automobiles. It is managed by Trofeo Motorsport Pty Ltd and sanctioned by the Confederation of Australian Motor Sport (CAMS) as an Authorised Series.

Series winners
 2016 – Rob Smith (Audi R8 LMS)
 2017 – Steve McLaughlan (Audi R8 LMS Ultra)
 2018 – Nick Kelly (Audi R8 LMS Ultra)
 2021 – Brad Schumacher (Audi R8 LMS Ultra)
 2022 – Michael Kokkinos (Audi R8 LMS Ultra)

See also
 Australian GT Championship

References